The Annual Champion Stakes is a discontinued Thoroughbred horse race run from 1900 through 1908 that was the richest in the United States at the time for older horses with a guarantee purse of $25,000. Run on dirt over a distance of two and one-quarter miles at the Sheepshead Bay Race Track in Sheepshead Bay, Brooklyn, New York, the race was open to horses age three and older. The race was created to try to slow a decade-long trend to shorter distance races.

Hart–Agnew Law
The Annual Champion Stakes was last run on September 12, 1908 and was won by King James.
 Earlier that year the Republican controlled New York Legislature under Governor Charles Evans Hughes passed the Hart–Agnew anti-betting legislation on June 11, 1908 with penalties allowing for fines and up to a year in prison. The owners of Sheepshead Bay Race Track, and other racing facilities in New York state, struggled to stay in business without wagering revenue. Racetrack operators had no choice but to drastically reduce the purse money being paid out which by 1909 saw many stakes races being canceled or offering a substantially reduced purse. Further restrictive legislation was passed by the New York Legislature in 1910 which deepened the financial crisis for track operators and led to a complete shutdown of racing across the state during 1911 and 1912. When a Court ruling saw racing return in 1913 it was too late for any revival of the Annual Champion Stakes as the Sheepshead Bay horse racing facility never reopened.

Records
Speed record:
 3:53 3/5 – Igniter (1903)

Most wins:
 no horse won this race more than once

Most wins by a jockey:
 no jockey won this race more than once

Most wins by a trainer:
 2 – Matthew M. Allen (1902, 1906)
 2 – John E. Madden (1907, 1908)

Most wins by an owner:
 no owner won this race more than once

Winners

References

Open long distance horse races
Discontinued horse races in New York City
Sheepshead Bay Race Track
Recurring sporting events established in 1900
Recurring sporting events disestablished in 1908